Krzyszkowice may refer to the following places:
Krzyszkowice, Lesser Poland Voivodeship (south Poland)
Krzyszkowice, Łódź Voivodeship (central Poland)
Krzyszkowice, Masovian Voivodeship (east-central Poland)
Krzyszkowice, Świętokrzyskie Voivodeship (south-central Poland)
Krzyszkowice, district of Wieliczka